Achenbach is a German surname. Notable people with the surname include:

 Andreas Achenbach (1815–1910), German painter
 Ernst Achenbach (1909–1991), German diplomat and politician
 Gerd B. Achenbach (born 1947), German philosopher
 Heinrich von Achenbach (1829-1899), Prussian politician, agriculture minister
 Jan D. Achenbach (born 1935), American professor at Northwestern University
 Joel Achenbach (born 1960), American journalist
 Max Alvary (1856–1898), originally Maximilian Achenbach, German tenor
 Oswald Achenbach (1827–1905), German painter
 Thomas M. Achenbach (born 1940), American psychiatrist
 Timo Achenbach (born 1982), German footballer

Other uses 
 Achenbach House, historic place in New Jersey, United States
 Achenbach System of Empirically Based Assessment
 Paroxysmal hand hematoma, Achenbach Syndrome, "blue finger"

References 

German-language surnames

de:Achenbach